The International Association of Arabic Dialectology (AIDA) is an association of researchers in Arabic dialects, from all over the world.

About AIDA
AIDA was founded in 1992, in Paris, at the initiative of a group of prestigious Arabists, with the aim to encourage and promote the study of Arabic dialects.

AIDA is nowadays the leading international association in this field of research and it has become a center that joins scholars from all over the world who are interested in any aspect of Arabic dialectology, including dialects which have not been described yet, dialectal geography, specific aspects of phonology, morphology and syntax, code-switching, koiné language, pidgin, creole, the lexicon of Arabic dialects, dialectal atlases, comparative and diachronic studies, sociolinguistics, teaching of Arabic dialects, and so on.

AIDA organizes conferences that are held in well-known universities every two years (with some exceptions).

Previous conferences

14th AIDA Conference - Granada 2022
13th AIDA Conference – Kutaisi 2019
12th AIDA Conference – Marseille 2017
11th AIDA Conference – Bucharest 2015
10th AIDA Conference – Doha 2013
9th AIDA Conference – Pescara 2011
8th AIDA Conference – Colchester 2008
7th AIDA Conference – Vienna 2006
6th AIDA Conference – Hammamet 2004
5th AIDA Conference – Cádiz 2002
4th AIDA Conference – Marrakech 2000
3rd AIDA Conference – Malta 1998
2nd AIDA Conference – Cambridge 1995
1st AIDA Conference – Paris 1993

Next conference
15th AIDA Conference – Malta 2024

First Executive Board (1993 - 2004)
Dominique Caubet (France) – president
Abderrahim Youssi (Morocco) - vice-president
Bruce Ingham (Great Britain) – vice-president
Manwel Mifsud (Malta) – secretary
Peter Behnstedt (Germany) – vice-secretary
Martine Vanhove (France) – treasurer

Second Executive Board (2004 - 2015)

Stephan Procházka (Austria) – president
Abderrahim Youssi (2004-2013) / Karima Ziamari (2013-2015) (Morocco) – vice-president
Rudolf de Jong  (Netherlands)  – general secretary
Ángeles Vicente  (Spain) – treasurer

Current Executive Board of AIDA (May 28, 2015, Bucharest)

► George Grigore (University of Bucharest, Romania) – president

► Karima Ziamari (Moulay Ismail University, Meknes, Morocco) – vice-president

► Kristen Brustad (University of Texas at Austin, USA) – vice-president (until 2019)

►Christophe Pereira (INALCO, Paris, France) – vice-president (from 2019)

► Liesbeth Zack (University of Amsterdam, Netherlands) – general secretary

► Veronika Ritt-Benmimoun (University of Vienna, Austria) – treasurer

Reshuffled Current Executive Board of AIDA - June 30, 2022 - Granada

► George Grigore (University of Bucharest, Romania) – president

► Karima Ziamari (Moulay Ismail University, Meknes, Morocco) – vice-president

►Christophe Pereira (INALCO, Paris, France) – vice-president 

► Bettina Leitner (University of Vienna, Austria) – general secretary

► Simone Bettega (University of Turin, Italy) – treasurer

References

External links
 AIDA - official site
 Arabic Varieties: Far and Wide. Proceedings of the 11th International Conference of AIDA Bucharest 2015                     
 AIDA on academia.edu
 The 12th Conference of AIDA - Aix-Marseille University, May 18-20, 2017 

International professional associations
International scientific organizations
Linguistic societies
Organizations established in 1993
Organizations based in Paris
Arabic language